Alberto Gamaliel Guevara Rocha (born 15 July 1990) is a Mexican professional boxer who challenged twice for a bantamweight world title in 2012 and 2013.

Professional career
On December 15, 2012, Guevara was defeated by Leo Santa Cruz in a fight for the IBF Bantamweight championship of the world. On November 10, 2013, Guevara was knocked out by Shinsuke Yamanaka in a WBC bantamweight title fight.

Guevara was scheduled to fight Randy Caballero for the IBF bantamweight title in February 2015. This would have been Guevara's third opportunity for a world title. However, Caballero had to pull out of the fight due to an ankle injury and subsequent surgery. Guevara lost to Emmanuel Rodríguez in June 2016, bringing his record up to 24–3.

References

External links
 

1990 births
Living people
Mexican male boxers
Bantamweight boxers
Featherweight boxers
Boxers from Sinaloa
Sportspeople from Mazatlán
21st-century Mexican people